Swimming New Zealand is the national governing body of swimming,  in New Zealand. Swimming New Zealand, then known as The New Zealand Amateur Swimming Association was founded on 4 January 1890.

Swimming New Zealand is a member of FINA and has responsibility for elite performance, doping control and international relationships and events for the sports within New Zealand.

Swimming New Zealand is also a member of Water Safety New Zealand and has an active role in swim and survive education in New Zealand.

History
The New Zealand Amateur Swimming Association was founded on 4 January 1890 at the urging of the Auckland (Swimming) Club, and was based in Auckland. When the headquarters moved to Christchurch in 1896 the Auckland club withdrew from the Association and in 1898 formed a rival association, the New Zealand Amateur Swimming Association Registered. The two associations were reunited on 21 March 1904.

The first national championship events were held in the year the Association was formed, with a different carnival for each event until 1905 when all events were held at a single venue.

The first championship event for women was held in 1912.

The NZASA became the New Zealand Swimming Federation in 1988 and changed to its present name in 1999.

New Zealand Swimmers of the Year
Swimming New Zealand announces a number of awards annually, most notably the New Zealand Swimmer of the Year Award.

Stakeholders and affiliations
Swimming New Zealand's key stakeholders include:
Swimming Northland
Swimming Auckland
Swimming Counties Manukau
Swimming Waikato
Swimming Bay of Plenty
Swimming Taranaki
Swimming Hawkes Bay Poverty Bay
Swimming Manawatu
Swimming Wellington
Swimming Nelson Marlborough
Swimming Canterbury West Coast
Swimming Otago
Swimming Southland
New Zealand Swim Coaches and Teachers Association (NZSCTA)

See also
List of New Zealand records in swimming

References

External links
 Official site

New Zealand
Sports governing bodies in New Zealand
Swimming organizations
Swimming in New Zealand
New Zealand
1890 establishments in New Zealand
Sports organizations established in 1890